Encoptolophus pallidus, known generally as the pale clouded grasshopper or southwestern clouded grasshopper, is a species of band-winged grasshopper in the family Acrididae. It is found in North America.

References

Further reading

 
 
 
 

Oedipodinae
Articles created by Qbugbot
Insects described in 1893